The Samsung Galaxy A30s is Samsung Electronics' smartphone announced by Samsung Electronics. The phone has a triple-camera setup with a 25 MP main camera, a 6.4 inches HD+ Infinity-V display, and a 4000 mAh Li-Po battery. It ships with Android Pie.

References 

Samsung Galaxy
Mobile phones introduced in 2019
Android (operating system) devices
Samsung smartphones
Mobile phones with multiple rear cameras